The 2021 SpeedyCash.com 220 was the 11th stock car race of the 2021 NASCAR Camping World Truck Series season, and the 25th iteration of the event. The race was held on June 12, 2021 in Fort Worth, Texas at Texas Motor Speedway, a  permanent quad-oval racetrack. The race took 147 laps to complete. At race's end, John Hunter Nemechek of Kyle Busch Motorsports would win his 10th race overall in the NASCAR Camping World Truck Series and his 4th of the season. Chase Elliott, driving a one-off race for GMS Racing, and Grant Enfinger of ThorSport Racing would fill in the rest of the podium, finishing 2nd and 3rd, respectively.

Background 

Texas Motor Speedway is a speedway located in the northernmost portion of the U.S. city of Fort Worth, Texas – the portion located in Denton County, Texas. The track measures 1.5 miles (2.4 km) around and is banked 24 degrees in the turns, and is of the oval design, where the front straightaway juts outward slightly. The track layout is similar to Atlanta Motor Speedway and Charlotte Motor Speedway (formerly Lowe's Motor Speedway). The track is owned by Speedway Motorsports, Inc., the same company that owns Atlanta and Charlotte Motor Speedway, as well as the short-track Bristol Motor Speedway.

Entry list

Starting lineup 
Qualifying was determined by a qualifying metric system based on the last race, the 2021 North Carolina Education Lottery 200 and owner's points. As a result, John Hunter Nemechek of Kyle Busch Motorsports would win the pole.

Race results 
Stage 1 Laps: 35

Stage 2 Laps: 35

Stage 3 Laps: 77

References 

2021 NASCAR Camping World Truck Series
NASCAR races at Texas Motor Speedway
SpeedyCash.com 220
SpeedyCash.com 220